Mi smo divovi was a song released by Bosnian singer-songwriter Benjamin Isović in 2009 which has in subsequent years become the official anthem of Bosnian Football club, FK Sarajevo. Isović, who is the son of Bosnian Sevdah singer Safet Isović, is a supporter of the Sarajevo-based side and president of one of the club's fan associations.

References

External links

2009 songs
FK Sarajevo songs
Bosnian-language songs